Route 450A, also known as Lewin Parkway, is an alternate route of Route 450 in the city of Corner Brook, Newfoundland and Labrador. The route runs from Route 450, through downtown Corner Brook, to Route 1 (Trans-Canada Highway). Lewin Parkway functions as a city route through Corner Brook, and is designated as the route between Route 450 and Route 1.

The section of Route 450A between the Trans-Canada Highway and the Riverside Drive is designated as a Core Route (Intermodule link) of Canada's National Highway System as it connects Route 1 with the Port of Corner Brook.

Major intersections

References

450A
Corner Brook